Jack Harris may refer to:

Entertainment
 Jack Harris (film editor) (1905–1971), English film editor
 Jack H. Harris (1918–2017), American film producer
 Jack Harris (broadcaster) (born 1941), American radio personality based in Tampa, Florida
 Jack C. Harris (born 1947), American comic book writer and editor
 Jack Harris (musician) (born 1951), English vocalist for The Alan Parsons Project
 Jack Harris (singer-songwriter) (born 1986), Welsh-born folk singer-songwriter and guitarist

Politics
 Jack Harris (Ontario politician) (1917–1997)
 Jack Harris (Newfoundland and Labrador politician) (born 1948), Canadian MP

Sports
 Jack Harris (American football) (1902–1973), American football player in the National Football League
 Jack Harris (footballer, born 1891) (1891–1966), Scottish professional football player and manager
 Jack Harris (athlete) (1902–1997), Canadian Olympic athlete
 Jack Harris (golfer) (1922–2014), Australian golfer

Other
 Sir Jack Harris, 2nd Baronet (1906–2009), New Zealand businessman

See also
John Harris (disambiguation)
Jacky Harris (1900–1943), Australian rules footballer